Israel B. Abbott (1843-1887) was a politician from North Carolina who served in the North Carolina House of Representatives in 1872 during the Reconstruction era. He was African American.

Abbott was born free and was employed during the American Civil War as a servant to a Confederate officer. In 1861, he fled to New Bern, North Carolina, where he stayed until the entry of Federal troops to the city following the Battle of New Bern in March 1862. During the Reconstruction Era, Abbott became involved in the North Carolina Republican Party and served in the North Carolina House of Representatives from 1872-1874. He represented Craven County. He later chaired his state's the Republican Convention in 1884. In 1886, Abbott challenged fellow Republican James E. O'Hara, who was originally from New York City and was of both black and white ancestry. Both Abbott and O'Hara lost to  the white Democrat Furnifold McLendel Simmons in the general election. Simmons eventually became a leader in the movement to disenfranchise Black North Carolinians. Abbott died at New Bern in 1887.

See also
 African-American officeholders during and following the Reconstruction era

References

1843 births
1887 deaths
Politicians from New Bern, North Carolina
Republican Party members of the North Carolina House of Representatives
African-American state legislators in North Carolina
19th-century American politicians